Colònia la Fàbrica is a locality located in the municipality of Artesa de Segre, in Province of Lleida province, Catalonia, Spain. As of 2020, it has a population of 58.

Geography 
Colònia la Fàbrica is located 65km northeast of Lleida.

References

Populated places in the Province of Lleida